Zonaria is a genus of thalloid brown alga comprising approximately 12 species. Specimens can reach around 25 cm in size, all of which exhibit a characteristic semi-circular growth pattern which produces distinct alternating patterns of darker and lighter tissue akin to tree rings. Zonaria produces tetraspores.

Zonaria is widespread with some species being locally abundant upon shallow subtidal of rock reefs.

The species currently recognised are:

The three Zonaria Australian species Z. turneriana, Z. crenata and Z. angustata produce phloroglucinol derivatives.

References

External links 
 Images of Zonaria at Algaebase

Dictyotaceae
Brown algae genera